The Toronto Raptors have made 35 National Basketball Association (NBA) draft selections during their draft history. The Raptors began as an expansion team in 1995 and first participated in the NBA draft on June 28, 1995 at SkyDome, now known as Rogers Centre, in Toronto, Ontario, Canada. In 1989, the NBA agreed with the National Basketball Players' Association to limit drafts to two rounds, an arrangement that has remained the same up the present time. Before each draft, an NBA Draft Lottery determines the first round selection order for the teams that missed the playoffs during the prior season. Teams can also trade their picks, which means that in some drafts teams may have more or less than two draft picks, although they must have at least one first-round pick every other year.

The first pick in Toronto Raptors' history was Damon Stoudamire, a point guard from the University of Arizona, who was the seventh overall pick in the 1995 NBA draft. People in the crowd were surprised by this pick because they expected the Raptors to pick Ed O'Bannon from UCLA. In their second pick of the same draft, Fab Five member Jimmy King from Michigan was drafted in the second round. The Raptors won the first overall pick in 1996, but they had to give that up due to the expansion agreement with the league. Chris Bosh was selected by the Raptors as the fourth pick overall in the 2003 NBA draft, and he went on to play in three all-star games, while starting in two. Andrea Bargnani, who was selected by the Raptors with the first overall pick of the 2006 NBA draft, became the first European to be picked first overall in the NBA draft.

Seven of the players that the Raptors have drafted were named to the NBA All-Rookie Team first team in their respective rookie seasons—Damon Stoudamire in 1996, Marcus Camby in 1997, Morris Peterson in 2001, Chris Bosh in 2004, Charlie Villanueva in 2006, Andrea Bargnani in 2007, and Scottie Barnes in 2022—and Stoudamire and Barnes were named the Rookie of the Year in 1996 and 2022, respectively.

Key

Selections

Notes
  On June 28, 1998, Toronto acquired the draft rights to Vince Carter and cash considerations from the Golden State Warriors in exchange for the draft rights to Antawn Jamison.
  On February 13, 1998, Toronto acquired Kenny Anderson, Gary Trent, Alvin Williams, two first-round draft picks, one second-round draft pick, and cash from the Portland Trail Blazers, in exchange for Damon Stoudamire, Walt Williams, and Carlos Rogers.
  On January 21, 1999, Toronto acquired Micheal Williams, the draft rights to Željko Rebrača, a 1999 first-round draft pick from the Denver Nuggets, and a 2000 first-round draft pick from the Minnesota Timberwolves in exchange for Chauncey Billups and the draft rights to Tyson Wheeler being traded to Denver in a three-team deal with Minnesota.
  On June 28, 1999, Toronto acquired Antonio Davis from the Indiana Pacers in exchange for the draft rights to Jonathan Bender.
  On February 22, 2001, Toronto acquired a first-round draft pick from New York, originally belonged by Seattle, in exchange for Mark Jackson and Muggsy Bogues.
  On June 26, 2002, Toronto acquired Lindsey Hunter, the draft rights to Chris Jefferies and a 2003 second round draft pick from the Los Angeles Lakers in exchange for Tracy Murray, the draft rights to Kareem Rush and a 2003 second round draft pick.
  On September 25, 2002, Toronto acquired a second round draft pick from Cleveland Cavaliers and Lamond Murray, in exchange for Michael Stewart and a first round draft pick.
  On June 24, 2004, Toronto acquired the draft rights to Pape Sow and a 2005 second round draft pick from the Miami Heat in exchange for the draft rights to Albert Miralles.
  On December 17, 2004, Toronto acquired Eric Williams, Aaron Williams and Alonzo Mourning, along with the 2005, originally belonged to Philadelphia, and 2006, originally belonged to Denver, first round draft picks from the New Jersey Nets in exchange for Vince Carter.
  On January 2, 2004, Toronto acquired Robert Archibald along with the 2005 second round draft pick from Orlando Magic for Mengke Bateer, the rights to second-round draft pick Remon van de Hare and the 2005 second round draft pick.
  On January 31, 2006, Toronto acquired the 2006, which originally belonged to the Miami Heat, and 2009 second round draft picks from the New Orleans Hornets in exchange for Aaron Williams.
  On June 28, 2006, Toronto acquired cash considerations from the Philadelphia 76ers in exchange for the draft rights to Edin Bavčić.
  On July 9, 2008, Toronto acquired Jermaine O'Neal and the draft rights to Nathan Jawai from the Indiana Pacers in exchange for T. J. Ford, Rasho Nesterovič, Maceo Baston, and the draft rights to Roy Hibbert.
  On July 10, 2013, Toronto acquired the Oklahoma City Thunder second-round pick from the New York Knicks along with Marcus Camby, Steve Novak, Quentin Richardson, a 2016 first-round draft pick, and a 2017 second-round draft pick in exchange for Andrea Bargnani.
  On June 26, 2014, Toronto acquired cash considerations from the Brooklyn Nets in exchange for the draft rights to Xavier Thames.

References
General
 
 
Specific

 
National Basketball Association draft
draft history